Uwe Helu (Japanese name as Japanese national: ヘルウヴェ or ヘル ウヴェ, born 12 July 1990) is a Tongan-born, Japanese international rugby union player who plays as a lock or flanker. He received Japanese Citizenship in 2016.

Club career

Helu was born in Tonga, attended St Thomas of Canterbury College in Christchurch, New Zealand and then university in Tokyo, Japan.   After graduating from university he signed up to play Top League rugby with Yamaha Júbilo in 2014.   His appearances were sparse in his first two seasons with Yamaha, but in 2016 he began to be much more of a regular in the side.

International 

After only 13 Top League appearances for Yamaha Júbilo, which included 3 starts, Helu received his first call-up to his adopted country, Japan's senior squad ahead of the 2016 end-of-year rugby union internationals.

References 

1990 births
Living people
Japanese rugby union players
Tongan rugby union players
Japan international rugby union players
Rugby union locks
Rugby union flankers
Shizuoka Blue Revs players
Takushoku University alumni
People from Nagano Prefecture
People educated at St Thomas of Canterbury College
Tongan expatriates in Japan
Tongan expatriates in New Zealand
Sunwolves players
Kubota Spears Funabashi Tokyo Bay players